Thomas Beck (1819 – ?) was an African-American Republican politician who served three terms in the Texas House of Representatives. Various sources list his birthplace as Kentucky, Mississippi, or Virginia.  He moved to Texas about 1842 and began farming in Grimes County.

According to his biographical sketch in the 1879 Texas Legislative Manual, he served in the Confederate Army for four months at Fort Smith, Arkansas.  During his time in the legislature he served on the following committees:  Privileges and Elections, Agriculture and Stock Raising, and Roads, Bridges, and Ferries.  He also supported funding for what is now the historically black Prairie View A&M University in Prairie View, Texas.  He worked to pass legislation which prevents children from being employed without the permission of their parents. Beck and his wife, Martha, had at least three children.

References 
Forever Free: Nineteenth Century African-American Legislators and Constitutional Convention Delegates of Texas
Texas Legislators: Past & Present - Thomas Beck
Handbook of Texas Online - Thomas Beck

1819 births
Republican Party members of the Texas House of Representatives
People from Grimes County, Texas
African-American state legislators in Texas
African-American politicians during the Reconstruction Era
People of Texas in the American Civil War
Year of death missing